Letham is a small village in Fife, Scotland, located just off the A92, around 5 miles from Cupar. According to the 2001 Census, Letham has 138 residents, although this has without a doubt increased in the previous years.

Its school, Letham Primary School, educates around 35 pupils, between the ages of 5 and 12. The school building itself is over 130 years old, and built mainly from sandstone which was quarried only 200 metres away from the school.

Cunnoquhie House is a late 18th-century classical mansion located just north of Letham. It was built for George Paterson of Cunnoquhie, and is a category A listed building.

References

Letham village website
Scottish Census Results OnLine

External links
Bow of Fife, Collessie & Letham web portal

Villages in Fife